Adriano dos Santos (born 26 January 1988) is a South African cricketer. He played in six first-class and three List A matches from 2006 to 2008.

References

External links
 

1988 births
Living people
South African cricketers
Eastern Province cricketers
Mpumalanga cricketers
People from Mbombela